The Torneo Intermedio was played during the 1993 Copa América. The 16 clubs were divided into 4 groups and the top two teams advanced to the quarterfinals. Although Deportivo Municipal won the tournament, they declined to play in the 1994 Copa CONMEBOL and the end-of-season Liguilla runner-up received this berth.

Teams

Group stage

Group 1

Group 2

Group 3

Group 4

Knockout phase

Quarterfinals

Semifinals

Final

External links
Peruvian Football Federation 
RSSSF

Peru
Tor
Peruvian Primera División